Tamashiro (written: 玉城) is a Japanese surname. Notable people with the surname include:

Akio Tamashiro, Peruvian karateka
Sachi Tamashiro (born 1980), Mexican actress
, Japanese footballer
Tim Tamashiro, Canadian jazz singer and radio presenter
, Japanese model and idol
, Japanese footballer

Japanese-language surnames